Lloyd Ellingson (February 23, 1908 – March 28, 1946) was an American skier. He competed in the Nordic combined event at the 1932 Winter Olympics. He was killed in a plane crash in 1946.

References

External links
 

1908 births
1946 deaths
American male Nordic combined skiers
Olympic Nordic combined skiers of the United States
Nordic combined skiers at the 1932 Winter Olympics
People from Colfax, Wisconsin
Sportspeople from Wisconsin